Tayfun Pirselimoğlu (born 1959) is a Turkish screenwriter and film director. He has contributed to more than eight films including I Am Not Him and Haze.

Bibliography 
Çöl Masalları (1996, Yapı Kredi Yayınları)
Kayıp Şahıslar Albümü (2002, İthaki Yayınları)
Malihulya (2005, İthaki Yayınları)
Şehrin Kuleleri (2005, İthaki Yayınları)
Otel Odaları (2009, İthaki Yayınları)
Harry Lime'in En Yeni Hayatları ya da Üçüncü Adam'a Övgü (2012, İthaki Yayınları)
Kerr (2014, İthaki Yayınları)
Berber (2016, İletişim Yayınları)
Çölün Öbür Tarafı (2018, İletişim Yayınları)
Kadastrocu (2021, İletişim Yayınları)

Filmography 
Kerr (2021) (director, scriptwriter)
Yol Kenarı (2017) (director, producer, scriptwriter)
Ben O Değilim (2013) (director, producer, scriptwriter)
Saç (2010) (director, producer, scriptwriter)
Pus (2009) (director, producer, scriptwriter)
Rıza (2006) (director, producer, scriptwriter)
İngiliz Kemal (2001) (scriptwriter)
Hiçbiryerde (2001) (director, scriptwriter)
Dayım (1999) (director)
Yeni Bir Yıldız (1997) (scriptwriter)
İz (1994) (scriptwriter, art director)
Otel (1992) (producer, scriptwriter)

References

External links 

1959 births
Living people
Turkish film directors
Turkish male screenwriters